Heather Ann Arseth is an American-Mauritian swimmer. At the 2012 Summer Olympics she finished 34th overall in the heats in the Women's 200 metre freestyle and failed to reach the semifinals.

References

External links
 
 Miami Hurricanes bio

Living people
1993 births
People from Plymouth, Minnesota
American female swimmers
American female freestyle swimmers
Mauritian female swimmers
Mauritian female freestyle swimmers
Olympic swimmers of Mauritius
Swimmers at the 2012 Summer Olympics
Swimmers at the 2016 Summer Olympics
Swimmers at the 2015 African Games
African Games competitors for Mauritius
American people of Mauritian descent
American people of French descent
Mauritian people of American descent
Mauritian people of French descent
Miami Hurricanes women's swimmers
Iowa Hawkeyes women's swimmers